The 1924–25 Sheffield Shield season was the 29th season of the Sheffield Shield, the domestic first-class cricket competition of Australia. Victoria won the championship.

Table

Statistics

Most Runs
Alan Kippax 532

Most Wickets
Clarrie Grimmett 28

Notable events

South Australia's victory by 161 runs over New South Wales at Adelaide in January 1925 was their first victory in a Sheffield Shield match since their defeat of Victoria at Adelaide in February 1914.

References

Sheffield Shield
Sheffield Shield
Sheffield Shield seasons